The 1962 Michigan Wolverines baseball team represented the University of Michigan in the 1962 NCAA University Division baseball season. The Wolverines played their home games at Ferry Field. The team was coached by Don Lund in his 4th season at Michigan.

The Wolverines won the College World Series, defeating the Santa Clara Broncos in the championship game.

Roster

Front Row: Dennis Spalla, Dick Honig, John Kerr, Don Lund (head coach), Joe Merullo, Wayne Slusher, Dave Roebuck
Second Row: Bruce Kropschot (manager), Dick Post, Joe Jones, Ron Tate, Jim Newman, Milbry Benedict (assistant coach)
Back Row: Jim Steckley, Jim Bobel, Ron Lauterbach, Bob Dunston, Dave Campbell, Fritz Fisher, Harvey Chapman

Schedule

Awards and honors 
Dave Roebuck
All-Big Ten First Team

Dennis Spalla
All-Big Ten First Team

References

Michigan
Michigan Wolverines baseball seasons
College World Series seasons
NCAA Division I Baseball Championship seasons
Michigan Wolverines baseball